The history of chess began nearly 1500 years ago, and over the past millennium and a half the game has changed drastically. No technology or strategy, however, has changed chess as much as the introduction of chess engines. Despite only coming into existence within the previous 70 years, the introduction of chess engines has molded and defined how top chess is played today.

Pre-computer era engines ( - 1940s)

The Mechanical Turk 
The earliest form of a 'chess engine' appears in the 18th century with a machine named the Mechanical Turk. Created by Hungarian inventor Wolfgang von Kempelen, the Mechanical Turk, a life sized human model, debuted in 1770 as the worlds first autonomous chess robot. The Mechanical Turk could play chess and beat opponents, even going as far as solving the iconic knight's tour chess puzzle. From 1770 to 1854 the Mechanical Turk would remain in operation, only to eventually go down in a fire. Years after the machines demise the hoax would be uncovered, with a human being the true source of the Mechanical Turk's intelligence the entire time.

El Ajedrecista 

The first real instance of a chess computer would appear in 1912, with an automaton named El Ajedrecista built by Leonardo Torres y Quevedo. Unlike the Mechanical Turk, El Ajedrecista was actually the first autonomous machine capable of playing chess. El Ajedrecista could play an endgame with white, in which white has a king and rook, while black only has a king. The machine was capable of checkmating the black king (played by a human) every time, and able to identify illegal moves. El Ajedrecista marked the first actual chess engine, and created lots of excitement around the field in general.

The beginning of chess computing (1940s - 1950s) 
World War II would lead to astonishing technological breakthroughs, the largest of these of course being the invention/creation of the computer. Two men, Alan Turing and Claude Shannon pioneered these innovations, and come the end of WW2 both would pick up an interest in programming a chess engine. In 1949, Claude Shannon would publish a paper detailing a program that could potentially play chess against a human. One year later, Alan Turing would create the first computer chess playing algorithm, yet the hardware at the time lacked in power. Turing would test his algorithm by hand, and although the algorithm itself was weak, Turing and Shannon had laid the foundation of greatness.

In 1951 a close colleague of Turing, a man named Dietrich Prinz, would manage to create and implement a basic chess algorithm that was capable of solving mate in two. The algorithm ran on the Ferranti Mark 1, the first commercially available computer, and although lacking the power to play a full game would serve as a proof of concept for chess computing.

Finally, in 1957 an IBM engineer named Alex Bernstein created the world's first fully automated chess engine. The engine was built for the IBM 704 mainframe, and took around eight minutes per move. Capable of playing an entire game, this engine would mark the real beginning of chess computing.

The rise of chess engines (1960s - 1970s) 
The rapid advancement of computing in the 1960s and 1970s was key in increasing chess engine strength, both drastic software and hardware innovations lead to stronger engines.

Software advancements 
The most iconic game algorithm of all, the Minimax algorithm and its alpha-beta pruning optimization, was and remains key to chess programming and optimization. This algorithm, initially proven in 1928 by John von Neumann, focuses on maximizing one players score while minimizing the others. Major improvements to this algorithm would be developed specifically for chess programming, with the main goal of increasing search depth. These included...
 Move selection techniques
 Heuristic approaches
 Iterative deepening
 Opening/ending databases
During this time certain chess grandmasters would also devote themselves to the improvement of chess programming, with their advanced knowledge of the game. Most notably previous World Chess Champion Mikhail Botvinnik, who wrote several papers on the subject, specifically related to move selection techniques.

Hardware advancements 
Previously the greatest limiter people like Turing and Dietrich had to face, hardware advanced at an astonishing rate. In 1965 Gordon Moore observed that transistor count in computers had been doubling every two years, increasing hardware speed at an exponential rate. This is commonly referred to as Moore's law, and still holds true today.

Chess specific hardware also became prominent for chess engines in this time. In 1978 a chess engine named Belle would win the North American Computer Chess Championship run by the Association for Computing Machinery, the engines special hardware allowed it to analyze around thirty million positions in three minutes. This is also aided by the fact that Belle held both opening and ending database's, greatly aiding the hardware speed. Belle would go on to become to first chess engine to receive a Master rating two years later.

Closing the gap (1960s - 2000s)

Early competition 
The chess engines of 1960s and 1970s failed to compete with top chess players. In 1968, International Master David Levy offered $3000 to any chess engine that could best him in the next ten years. In 1977 Levy would face the chess engine Kaissa, coming out without losing a single match. 

In 1980 Edward Fredkin, computer science professor at Carnegie Mellon University, would offer up monetary prizes for chess engines to break barriers in the chess world. These included $10,000 for the first engine to reach Grandmaster level, and $100,000 for the first engine to beat a chess world champion. Suddenly competition in chess computing had become very real, and top minds were at play.

Deep Blue 
Deep Blue would begin under a different name, ChipTest. ChipTest was developed and built by Feng-hsiung Hsu, Thomas Anantharaman and Murray Campbell at Carnegie Mellon. They would initially enter the engine into the 1986 North American Computer Chess Championship and fall short, but come back the next year with an improved version and win the competition in a 4-0 sweep.

The team would develop a new machine starting 1988, named Deep Thought. Deep Thought had significant advantages over its previous version, and would stand apart from its competition. It would become the first engine to beat a grandmaster when it played Bent Larsen in a regular tournament match the same year it came out. Deep Thought would continue on to win the World Computer Chess Championship with an unbeaten 5-0 record the following year. Yet it would still fall to Garry Kasparov in two matches the same year, the gap between human and machine remained. For the following years Deep Thought would remain the chess engine champion, eventually becoming Deep Thought 2 and winning the North American Computer Chess Championship for the fifth time. In 1994 the team would become sponsored by IBM, the time of Deep Thought was ending.

Finally in 1995, a new chess engine prototype was released from the team at IBM, Deep Blue. The engine would be completed in 1996, and in the same year would go on to face chess champion Garry Kasparov for the first time. The match with Kasparov last six games, in which Deep Blue lost 4-2. But this still marked the first time a chess engine would beat the current chess champion in a regular match. Yet just a year later the team at IBM would have another chance, Deep Blue was upgraded and worked on by both engineers and top chess grandmasters. In a match that would become iconic, Deep Blue would become the first chess engine to beat the current chess champion in a full chess match. Despite controversial claims on Kasparov's behalf that IBM had cheated, the result marked a momentous achievement in chess computing.

The era of super-human engines (2000s - current) 
Kasparov's defeat would mark the end of a time when the best humans could beat the engines. Money continued to flow into chess computing and the industry flourished, not without controversy however. In 2011, the four time reigning champion engine Rybka, was disqualified from the World Computer Chess Championship for code plagiarism. New competitions would also spring up, with the Top Chess Engine Championship being founded in 2010 with a stronger emphasis on automated play, longer games, and allowing stronger hardware.

Up until the late 2010s the world of chess computing was advancing slowly, but the progress remained consistent and the engines stronger than ever. That was until 2017 when a team of programmers at Google company DeepMind released a brand new engine, AlphaZero.

Neural network revolution 
At the end of 2017 engineers at DeepMind released an engine that would shock the chess computing world. AlphaZero was fundamentally based on a different approach to chess computing, something that had never really been seen before. While previous engines had relied on searching through trees and evaluating positions, AlphaZero relied on a deep neural network for its analysis. This essentially meant AlphaZero could learn chess by itself.

The initial tests with AlphaZero were staggering; in a 100 game match against the current strongest engine Stockfish, AlphaZero won 28 games and tied the remaining 72. In many ways AlphaZero served not only as a breakthrough for chess computing, but for the AI world in general.

Since 2017, the presence of neural networks the in the worlds top chess engines has only grown. All top engines nowadays, Leela Chess Zero, Stockfish, and Komodo have all included neural networks in their engines. Yet the deep reinforcement learning used for AlphaZero remains uncommon in top engines.

Also see 
Computer chess

References 

Chess engines
Computer chess